Susan Wakarura Kihika is a Kenyan lawyer, politician and the first female governor of Nakuru County.She was elected as a senator in 2017  on Jubilee Party as a Majority whip. Susan held the position until the 11th of May 2020 when she was replaced by Senator Irungu Kang'ata. Prior to that, she served as the first female speaker of Nakuru County Assembly and held the position of the Vice Chair of the County Assemblies Forum (CAF).

Kihika is a well-known philanthropist. She has been involved in community projects and charity work including supporting women groups across the county. She is a strong advocate for the rights and welfare of children, especially those living with disabilities and the advancement of girl child education

Susan Kihika is among the most dignified female politicians in the country and also the President of the IPU Bureau of Women Parliamentarians.
She was a gubernatorial aspirant for Nakuru County in the 2022 Kenyan general election . She won the election and assumed office on 25 August 2022.

Background and education
Alice, her mother was her father's second wife. Susan attended Busara Forest View Academy in Nyahururu and Bishop Gatimu Ngandu Girls’ High School in Nyeri. She then migrated to the United States around 1992, for further education.

She was admitted to the University of North Texas, graduating with a Bachelor of Arts in Political Science. In 2006, she graduated with a Juris Doctor degree from the Law School of Southern Methodist University, in Dallas, Texas. Subsequently, she was admitted to the Texas Bar, after passing the requisite examinations.

Career before politics
Following her graduation from law school, she worked in the public service. Later she left public service and established The Kihika Law Firm in Dallas, Texas which had specialized mostly in representing immigrants In 2012, after 20 years in the United States, Kihika  travelled back to Kenya.

Political career
In 2013, she contested the Bahati Constituency parliamentary seat but lost to Kimani Ngunjiri.She vied for the Nakuru County Speaker’s seat where she defeated 7 opponents to emerge as the first Assembly Speaker of Nakuru County.

In 2017, she contested the Nakuru County senatorial seat and won on a Jubilee Party ticket as the first female Senator of Nakuru County. Kihika’s vision is to see peaceful coexistence within Nakuru county She has also been involved in supporting social issues, economic empowerment initiatives and addressing insecurity

In  2018, Senator Susan Kihika was elected as the first Vice President of the Bureau of the Forum of Women Parliamentarians. In October the same year, Kihika took over first as the acting President and later as President replacing her predecessor Hon. Ulrika Karlsson of Sweden.

On 9 August 2022, she contested for the Nakuru County Governor and won on a UDA ticket. Susan defeated Lee Kinyanjui who was on a Jubilee Party ticket and became the first woman Governor for Nakuru county. She is commonly referred to by her county people as the "Woman of Firsts".

Family
Kihika was married to Sam Mburu in a traditional wedding on 7 November 2020 in Nyahururu. The ceremony was graced by the fifth President of the republic of Kenya, Dr. William Samoei Ruto, who also took part in the dowry negotiations.

See also
 Parliament of Kenya

References

External links
 I don’t want my kids near your wife, woman tells senator’s husband
 Senator Kihika, MPs in bid to save Speaker from ouster As of 19 June 2018.

Living people
21st-century Kenyan lawyers
Members of the Senate of Kenya
Kenyan women lawyers
21st-century Kenyan women politicians
21st-century Kenyan politicians
University of North Texas alumni
Southern Methodist University alumni
Alumni of Bishop Gatimu Ngandu Girls High School
Year of birth missing (living people)